Sarah Nicole Prickett is a writer, art critic and editor. She was the founder and editor of Adult, an arts and criticism magazine that launched in 2013.

Early life 
Prickett was born in London, Ontario. She lived in Toronto and moved to New York in 2012.

Career 
Prickett has been a contributing editor at The New Inquiry and Real Life. She has written on topics such as gender and sexual violence, clothes as memory, the nude in modernist and contemporary art, food, the mythology and myth of Wonder Woman, bipolar female memoirs, Instagram and envy, Jo Ann Callis, Elizabeth Hardwick, Aaron Sorkin Miley Cyrus, Lana Del Rey, Joan Didion, Peter Hujar, Gary Indiana, Clancy Martin, Renata Adler and Azealia Banks, Enlightened, Nymphomaniac, and Spring Breakers.

In 2014, T Magazine recommended Prickett's Tumblr in a weekly list of "five captivating online destinations you should be visiting often," noting she answers "anything you want to ask her on matters ranging from fledgling writing careers to shopping. She'll offer a personal opinion about anything and everything, especially topics that are rated NC-17."

In 2016, Brooklyn Magazine named Prickett as one of the "100 Most Influential People in Brooklyn Culture," citing her work on Adult as well as her writing for Hazlitt, n+1, Bookforum, Artforum, and T Magazine. The New York Times cited her alongside Justin Bieber, Ryan Gosling, and Grimes as one of seventeen public figures responsible for making Canada "hip." Later that year, Billboard announced that Prickett had been named an editor at Real Life, a new magazine on culture and technology.

Prickett wrote complete episode recaps of David Lynch's Twin Peaks: The Return in 2017.

References

External links

 Sarah Nicole Prickett on Tumblr
 Adult on Tumblr

Year of birth missing (living people)
Living people
21st-century Canadian women writers
Canadian women editors
Women art critics
Women magazine editors
Canadian fashion journalists
Writers from London, Ontario
Canadian art critics
Canadian magazine editors